Highland Park is a Sandwich Class Housing Scheme estate developed by the Hong Kong Housing Society situated at the mid-level of Lai King Hill, Kwai Chung, New Territories, Hong Kong near Lai King Fire Station and Lai King Disciplined Services Quarters. Formerly the site of Lai King Temporary Housing Area, it consists of six residential blocks completed in 1999.

Houses

Politics
Highland Park is located in Cho Yiu constituency of the Kwai Tsing District Council. It was formerly represented by Choi Nga-man, who was elected in the 2019 elections until July 2021.

Education
Highland Park is in Primary One Admission (POA) School Net 65, which includes multiple aided schools (schools operated independently of the government but funded with government money); none of the schools in the net are government schools.

See also

Public housing estates in Kwai Chung

References

Kwai Chung
Lai King
Residential buildings completed in 1999
Sandwich Class Housing Scheme